The American Colony Hotel is a luxury hotel located in a historic building in Jerusalem which previously housed the utopian American–Swedish community known as the American Colony.

History
The building was originally built and owned by an Ottoman Pasha Rabbah Daoud Amin Effendi al-Husseini, who lived there with his harem of four wives. Soon after his fourth marriage, al-Husseini died. In 1895, the building was sold to a group of messianic Christians who arrived in Jerusalem in 1881 and set up a commune. Their leader was Horatio Spafford, a lawyer from Chicago and his wife, Anna. In 1896, the Americans were joined by two groups of Swedish settlers. This Christian utopian society became known as the American Colony. 

In 1902, the Jaffa hotelier Plato von Ustinov (grandfather of the British actor Peter Ustinov) was looking for a place to put up guests visiting Jerusalem and asked the Spaffords to accommodate them. Soon after, the building was turned into a hotel.

Today
Today the American Colony Hotel calls itself an oasis of neutrality in the Palestinian-Israeli conflict. It is still owned by descendants of the Spaffords. A grandson, Horatio Vester, was the manager until he retired in 1980.
His wife, Valentine, lived in the hotel until her death in June 2008.
Since 1980, the hotel has been run by a Swiss company. The Effendis' original bedroom is called "Room One."

Famous guests
The American Colony Hotel, on the "seamline" between east and west Jerusalem, is the preferred hotel of many diplomats, politicians and foreign correspondents. Its famous guests include Jack Greenberg, Leon Uris, Lawrence of Arabia, Christiane Amanpour, Winston Churchill, Bob Dylan, Tony Blair, Philip Roth, Eric Frattini, and John le Carré. Le Carré wrote one of his books at the hotel, and Frattini included information about the hotel in his second novel, El Laberinto de Agua (The Labyrinth of Water).
In 1987, Michael Winner filmed much of the 1930s-set Agatha Christie mystery Appointment With Death at the hotel. In 1995, Peter Ustinov visited the hotel and planted a palm tree in the courtyard.

References

 Ohad, Daniella Smith, "Hotel Design in British Mandate Palestine: Modernism and the Zionist Vision". Journal of Israel History. 29 (1). (2010).

External links
 The Spafford Hymn - It is Well with my Soul - the original manuscript penned by Horatio Spafford
 Globe and Mail article
 The American Colony in Jerusalem Collection of Watercolors by George Kosinski including the original Ustinov Palm Tree, painted while the artist was based at the American Colony Hotel 1993-1999
 Hotel Website 

Hotels in Jerusalem
Late modern history of Jerusalem
Hotels established in 1902

he:המושבה האמריקאית בירושלים#מלון אמריקן קולוני